Faisal Zaman Khan (born 31 July 1967) has been Justice of the Lahore High Court since 22 March 2014.

References

1967 births
Living people
Judges of the Lahore High Court
Pakistani judges